Nizamabad is a town and a nagar panchayat in Azamgarh district in the Indian state of Uttar Pradesh. The city is well known for its black clay pottery.

Geography

Demographics
, Nizamabad had a population of 12,096. Males constitute 52% of the population and females 48%. Nizamabad has an average literacy rate of 60%: male literacy is 68%, and female literacy is 51%. In Nizamabad, 20% of the population is under six years of age. Nizamabad has one of the prominent gurdwaras of India where Guru Nanak visited and left his sandal, and hence the gurdwara is called Gurdwara Guru Nanak Charan Paduka. The town is on the Ballia–Shahganj broad gauge railway.

Economy
The black clay pottery of Nizamabad is a unique type of clay pottery known for its dark shiny body with engraved silver patterns. It was registered for a Geographical Indication tag in December 2015.

References

Cities and towns in Azamgarh district